Skødstrup is a village in Region of Southern Denmark (formerly in Ribe County) in Denmark.

References

Villages in Denmark